Layli Long Soldier is an Oglala Lakota poet, writer, feminist, artist, and activist.

Early life and education
Long Soldier grew up in the four corners region of the Southwest, where she continues to live and work to advocate against the continued, systematic oppression of indigenous populations. She graduated from the Institute of American Indian Arts with a Bachelor's in Fine Arts, and went on to earn a Master's at Bard College.

Career 
In 2010, she published the chapbook Chromosomory, and in 2013 participated in the art exhibit Pte Oyate at the Red Cloud Indian School, along with Roger Broer, Micheal Two Bulls and Keith Brave Heart.

Long Soldier is an editor of the journal Drunken Boat, and the poetry editor for Kore Press.

Her first volume of poetry, Whereas, published in 2017 by Graywolf Press explores the systemic violence against and cultural erasure of native tribes in the United States through a thoughtful investigation of language. Whereas responds to the cautiously phrased and quietly passed 2009 U.S. Congressional Apology to Native Peoples for the history of genocidal policies and actions the United States Federal government has enacted against them. In writing these poems, Long Soldier studied similar apologies from governments across the world to indigenous peoples and considered the nature of authentic apology.

The volume's longest poem, the five-page "38," recounts how 38 Sioux warriors were hanged, with the approval of President Lincoln, after the 1862 Sioux Uprising, on December 26, 1862. Long Soldier writes "This was the same week that President Lincoln signed the Emancipation Proclamation."

Whereas, however, mainly focuses on personal experiences, including Long Soldier's reflections on her relationship to her daughter and motherhood.

Awards and honors
2015 Lannan Literary Award
2016 National Artist Fellowship from the Native Arts and Cultures Foundation 
2016 Whiting Award  
2017 National Book Award for Poetry, finalist for Whereas
2017 National Book Critics Circle Award in Poetry, winner for Whereas
2018 PEN/Jean Stein Book Award, winner for Whereas
2018 Griffin Poetry Prize, shortlisted for Whereas

Works 
Chromosomory, Lubbock, TX : Q Ave Press, 2010. 
Whereas, Minneapolis, Minnesota: Graywolf Press, 2017,

References 

Native American women artists
Native American poets
Native American women writers
Year of birth missing (living people)
Living people
Place of birth missing (living people)
Oglala people
American editors
Chapbook writers
Bard College alumni
Institute of American Indian Arts alumni
21st-century American artists
21st-century American poets
21st-century American women writers
21st-century American women artists
21st-century Native Americans
21st-century Native American women